Fran Bera (December 7, 1924 in Mulliken, Michigan – February 10, 2018), was an American aviatrix and record setting pilot. She is the first woman to fly a helicopter with no tail rotor.

Early life 
Frances Sebastian was born, in 1924, to Hungarian immigrant farmers in Mulliken, Michigan, the youngest of eight children. She graduated from high school in Lake Odessa, Michigan, but was then rejected from the Women Airforce Service Pilots due to her height.

Career 
Fran was a CFII for over 50 years and administered over 3,000 check ride exams for new pilots and advanced rated pilots. She primarily flew fixed wing and helicopters through much of her life, and later flew her pink and white (with “Kick Ass” printed under the tail section) Piper Comanche, PA 24 – 260, single engine, for the remainder of her life.  She stopped logging her flight hours after 25,000.

Records and recognition 
Fran held many air racing records, and a record for the highest altitude in a normally aspirated aircraft (40,154+ feet in a Piper Aztec). Her list of accomplishments is numerous. Some of the awards she received include The Elder Statesmen Award for Aviation, presented to her in Washington, D.C. by former Senator Bob Dole, The Katharine Wright Award for over 50 years in aviation with no aviation accidents or incidents presented by the F.A.A., Women In Aviation (WIA) award for outstanding female aviator, inducted in the Women in Aviation International Pioneer Hall of Fame in 2006, and the San Diego Air & Space Museum Hall of Fame (2007), just to name a few.

In 2007, Bera was inducted into the International Air & Space Hall of Fame at the San Diego Air & Space Museum.

References

Bibliography

1924 births
2018 deaths
American women aviators
People from Michigan
Aviators from Michigan
Helicopter pilots
21st-century American women
American people of Hungarian descent